Tseung Kwan O Shining is a local political group based in Sai Kung and Tseung Kwan O founded in 2019. In a historic pro-democracy landslide in 2019 District Council election, the group won two seats in the Sai Kung District Council.

History
Tseung Kwan O Shining was formed in 2019 ahead the 2019 District Council election by a group of Sai Kung and Tseung Kwan O residents, aiming at running against the uncontested pro-Beijing candidates, improving community livelihood and supervising the governmental institutes. The group filled two candidates in the 2019 election, with Yu Tsun-ning contesting in Hang Hau West and Brandon Kenneth Yip running in Wai King. Both candidates won in their respective constituencies.

Performance in elections

Sai Kung District Council elections

References

External links
TKO Shining's facebook page

Political organisations based in Hong Kong
Political parties established in 2019
2019 establishments in Hong Kong
Liberal parties in Hong Kong